Kayonza is a small town in Kayonza district, Eastern Province, Rwanda. 

The town is centred on a roundabout, where the road east from Kigali splits into the road running north to the Ugandan border, and the road south to Tanzania. It is a major transport hub because of this junction, where a sizeable taxi-minibus park and terminus offers the Okapi, Atraco and Stella express services. It is also used as an overnight rest stop for truck drivers from Tanzania to Kigali and beyond. A small hotel provides basic accommodation, and there are two petrol pumps, a conference centre, a twice-weekly market and various bars and television halls.

It is also one of sites the company Zipline uses for delivering supplies to medical centres around the area using drones

Women's Opportunity Center

References 

 

Eastern Province, Rwanda
Districts and municipalities of Kibungo

Kayonza, Rwanda, now has a Women's Opportunity Center. It was designed by architect Sharon Davis, with funding provided by Women for Women International which is based in Washington D.C. The November 2013 issue of the magazine Architectural Digest shares the story and images from Kayonza.